2009 ACC tournament may refer to:

 2009 ACC men's basketball tournament
 2009 ACC women's basketball tournament
 2009 ACC men's soccer tournament
 2009 ACC women's soccer tournament
 2009 Atlantic Coast Conference baseball tournament
 2009 Atlantic Coast Conference softball tournament